Roszak is a surname. Notable people with the surname include: 

Maria Roszak (1908–2018), Polish nun
Matthew Roszak (born 1972/1973), American billionaire venture capitalist 
Romana Roszak (born 1994), Polish handballer
Theodore Roszak (disambiguation), several people
Thomas Roszak (born 1966), American architect